Anna Townsend (January 5, 1845 – September 11, 1923) was a long-time theatre actress who turned to silent film late in her life. Townsend performed in several Harold Lloyd films, she is probably best known for her role as Harold's good-hearted grandmother in Grandma's Boy (1922).

Townsend died at her home in Los Angeles. She was survived by a daughter.

Filmography

References

External links

1845 births
1923 deaths
Actresses from New York (state)
American film actresses
American silent film actresses
20th-century American actresses